The 1995–96 NSL Cup (known as the Johnnie Walker Cup under a sponsorship arrangement) was the twentieth season of the NSL Cup, which was the main national association football knockout cup competition in Australia. The 12 teams that competed in the 1995–96 National Soccer League competed in the cup.

Bracket

First round

|}

First leg

Second leg

Quarter-finals

Semi-finals

Final

References

NSL Cup
NSL Cup
1995 in Australian soccer
1996 in Australian soccer
NSL Cup seasons